Linear regression  includes any approach to modelling a predictive relationship for one set of variables based on another set of variables, in such a way that unknown parameters appear linearly. 

Linear regression may also refer to:
 The ordinary least squares method, one of the most popular methods for estimating a linear regression model for a univariate predictand
Weighted least squares, used for fitting linear regression with heteroscedastic errors
Generalized least squares, used for fitting linear regression with correlated and/or heteroscedastic errors
Simple linear regression, the simplest type of regression, involving only one explanatory variable 
General linear model for multivariate predictands
Generalised linear model for non-normal distributions
Bayesian linear regression, where statistical analysis is from a Bayesian viewpoint
Bayesian multivariate linear regression, for Bayesian analysis of multiple predictands

See also
Line regression